Breslau is an unincorporated community in Pierce County, Nebraska, United States. It is located on U.S. Route 20, approximately equidistant from Plainview and Osmond, at the corner of 541st Avenue.

History
Breslau got its start following construction of the Chicago, Burlington and Quincy Railroad through the territory. Breslau was originally built up chiefly by Germans. It was named after Breslau, formerly in Prussia (in modern-day Poland).

A post office was established in Breslau in 1911, and remained in operation until being discontinued in 1935.

References

Unincorporated communities in Pierce County, Nebraska
Unincorporated communities in Nebraska